The 2018 CONCACAF Champions League (officially the 2018 Scotiabank CONCACAF Champions League for sponsorship reasons) was the 10th edition of the CONCACAF Champions League under its current name, and overall the 53rd edition of the premier football club competition organized by CONCACAF, the regional governing body of North America, Central America, and the Caribbean.

The format of the tournament was changed as part of a new CONCACAF club competition platform consisting of two tournaments (CONCACAF League and CONCACAF Champions League) and a total of 31 teams competing during the season (an increase from the previous 24 teams), with 16 teams competing in the newly created CONCACAF League from August to October, and the winners of the CONCACAF League joining the 15 direct entrants competing in the CONCACAF Champions League from February to April. As a result, the 2018 edition was played using a new format that included the removal of the group stage, a reduction in participating teams from 24 to 16, and a total reduction in matches from 62 to 30.

Guadalajara defeated Toronto FC in the final to win their second CONCACAF club title and their first in the Champions League era, and qualified as the CONCACAF representative at the 2018 FIFA Club World Cup in the United Arab Emirates. Pachuca won the previous tournament but did not qualify for this tournament and were unable to defend their title.

Qualification
A total of 16 teams participated in the CONCACAF Champions League:
North American Zone: 9 teams (from three associations)
Central American Zone: 5 teams (from four associations; ordinarily from five associations, but Guatemalan teams were excluded from this season's tournament)
Caribbean Zone: 1 team (from one association)
Winners of the CONCACAF League (from one association, from either Central American Zone or Caribbean Zone)

Therefore, teams from either 8 or 9 out of the 41 CONCACAF member associations could participate in the CONCACAF Champions League.

North America
The nine berths for the North American Football Union (NAFU) were allocated to the three NAFU member associations as follows: four berths each for Mexico and the United States, and one berth for Canada.

For Mexico, the champions and runners-up of the Liga MX Apertura and Clausura Liguilla (playoff) tournaments qualified for the CONCACAF Champions League. If there was any team which were finalists of both tournaments, the vacated berth was reallocated using a formula, based on regular season records, that ensured that two teams qualified via each tournament.

For the United States, four teams qualified for the CONCACAF Champions League, three through the Major League Soccer (MLS) season and one through its domestic cup competition:
The champions of the MLS Cup, the championship match of the MLS Cup Playoffs
The champions of the Supporters' Shield, awarded to the team with the best MLS regular season record
The MLS regular season champions of either the Eastern Conference or Western Conference which were not the Supporters' Shield champions
The champions of the U.S. Open Cup
If there was any team which qualified through multiple berths, or if there was any Canada-based MLS team which were champions of the MLS Cup, the Supporters' Shield, or conference regular season, the vacated berth was reallocated to the U.S.-based team with the best MLS regular season record not yet qualified.

For Canada, the champions of the Canadian Championship, its domestic cup competition which awards the Voyageurs Cup, qualified for the CONCACAF Champions League. While some Canada-based teams competed in MLS, they could not qualify through either the MLS regular season or playoffs. In line with the launch of the new format, which placed the Canadian representative directly in the CONCACAF Champions League beginning in early 2018, the Canadian Soccer Association announced in March 2017 that a special one-match playoff between the 2016 champions Toronto FC and the 2017 champions would be played on 9 August 2017 in Toronto to determine who would qualify for the 2018 CONCACAF Champions League, except in the case that Toronto FC won the 2017 edition, in which the playoff would be unnecessary and Toronto FC would qualify automatically. As Toronto FC did later win the 2017 Canadian Championship, the playoff was not played.

Central America
The five berths for the Central American Football Union (UNCAF) were allocated to five of the seven UNCAF member associations as follows: one berth for each of Costa Rica, El Salvador, Guatemala, Honduras, and Panama. As all of the leagues of Central America employed a split season with two tournaments in one season, the champions with the better aggregate record (or any team which were champions of both tournaments) in the leagues of Costa Rica, El Salvador, Guatemala, Honduras, and Panama qualified for the CONCACAF Champions League.

If teams from any Central American associations were excluded, they were replaced by teams from other Central American associations, with the associations chosen based on results from previous CONCACAF Champions League tournaments. For this season, the team from Guatemala was excluded due to the suspension of their federation by FIFA and was replaced by an additional team from Costa Rica.

Caribbean
The sole berth for the Caribbean Football Union (CFU) was allocated via the Caribbean Club Championship, a subcontinental tournament open to the clubs of all 31 CFU member associations. To qualify for the Caribbean Club Championship, teams had to finish as the champions or runners-up of their respective association's league in the previous season, but professional teams could also be selected by their associations if they played in the league of another country. The champions of the Caribbean Club Championship qualified for the CONCACAF Champions League.

CONCACAF League

Besides the 15 direct entrants of the CONCACAF Champions League, another 16 teams (13 from Central America and 3 from the Caribbean) entered the CONCACAF League, a tournament held from August to October prior to the CONCACAF Champions League. The champions of the CONCACAF League qualified for the CONCACAF Champions League.

Teams
The following 16 teams (from eight associations) qualified for the tournament.

In the following table, the number of appearances, last appearance, and previous best result count only those in the CONCACAF Champions League era starting from 2008–09 (not counting those in the era of the Champions' Cup from 1962 to 2008).

Notes

Draw

The draw for the 2018 CONCACAF Champions League was held on 18 December 2017, 19:00 EST (UTC−5), at the Univision Studios in Miami, and was streamed on YouTube.

The draw determined each tie in the round of 16 (numbered 1 through 8) between a team from Pot 1 and a team from Pot 2, each containing eight teams. The "Bracket Position Pots" (Pot A and Pot B) contained the bracket positions numbered 1 through 8 corresponding to each tie. The teams from Pot 1 were assigned a bracket position from Pot A and the teams from Pot 2 were assigned a bracket position from Pot B. Teams from the same association could not be drawn against each other in the round of 16 except for "wildcard" teams which replaced a team from another association.

The seeding of teams was based on the new CONCACAF Club Index. Each team qualified for the CONCACAF Champions League based on criteria set by the respective associations (e.g., tournament champions, runners-up, cup champions), resulting in an assigned slot (e.g., MEX1, MEX2) for each team. The CONCACAF Club Index, instead of ranking each team, was based on the on-field performance of the teams that had occupied the respective qualifying slots in the previous five editions of the CONCACAF Champions League. To determine the total points awarded to a slot in any single edition of the CONCACAF Champions League, CONCACAF used the following formula:

The 16 teams were distributed in the pots as follows:

Format
In the CONCACAF Champions League, the 16 teams played a single-elimination tournament. Each tie was played on a home-and-away two-legged basis. If the aggregate score was tied after the second leg, the away goals rule would be applied, and if still tied, the penalty shoot-out would be used to determine the winner (Regulations, II. D. Tie-Breaker Procedures).

Schedule
The schedule of the competition was as follows.

Times up to 10 March 2018 (round of 16 and quarter-finals first legs) were Eastern Standard Time, i.e., UTC−5, thereafter (quarter-finals second legs and beyond) times were Eastern Daylight Time, i.e., UTC−4 (local times are in parentheses).

Bracket

Round of 16
In the round of 16, the matchups were decided by draw: R16-1 through R16-8. The teams from Pot 1 in the draw hosted the second leg.

Summary
The first legs were played from 20–22 February, and the second legs were played from 27 February – 1 March 2018.

Matches

Guadalajara won 7–0 on aggregate.

Seattle Sounders FC won 5–2 on aggregate.

New York Red Bulls won 3–1 on aggregate.

Tijuana Xolos won 2–1 on aggregate.

UANL won 5–3 on aggregate.

Toronto FC won 2–0 on aggregate.

3–3 on aggregate. Tauro won on away goals.

América won 6–2 on aggregate.

Quarter-finals
In the quarter-finals, the matchups were determined as follows:
QF1: Winner R16-1 vs. Winner R16-2
QF2: Winner R16-3 vs. Winner R16-4
QF3: Winner R16-5 vs. Winner R16-6
QF4: Winner R16-7 vs. Winner R16-8
The winners of round of 16 matchups 1, 3, 5, 7 hosted the second leg.

Summary
The first legs were played from 6–7 March, and the second legs were played from 13–14 March 2018.

Matches

Guadalajara won 3–1 on aggregate.

New York Red Bulls won 5–1 on aggregate.

4–4 on aggregate. Toronto FC won on away goals.

América won 7–1 on aggregate.

Semi-finals
In the semi-finals, the matchups were determined as follows:
SF1: Winner QF1 vs. Winner QF2
SF2: Winner QF3 vs. Winner QF4
The semi-finalists in each tie which had the better performance in previous rounds hosted the second leg.

Summary
The first legs were played on 3–4 April, and the second legs were played on 10 April 2018.

Matches

Guadalajara won 1–0 on aggregate.

Toronto FC won 4–2 on aggregate.

Final

In the final (Winner SF1 vs. Winner SF2), the finalist which had the better performance in previous rounds hosted the second leg.

Summary
The first leg was played on 17 April, and the second leg was played on 25 April 2018.

Matches

3–3 on aggregate. Guadalajara won 4–2 on penalties.

Top goalscorers

Awards

See also
2017 CONCACAF League
2018 FIFA Club World Cup

Notes

References

External links

 
2018
1
February 2018 sports events in North America
March 2018 sports events in North America
April 2018 sports events in North America